Mango's Beach Volleyball Club is a beach volleyball facility located in Baton Rouge, Louisiana. The facility, built in 1995, serves as the home of the LSU Tigers women's beach volleyball team, local leagues and local volleyball tournaments. The facility has 13 sand courts where tournaments are held and where LSU plays its home matches and hold practices.

Mango's operates in three seasons during spring, summer and fall. The facility has been expanded four times. It opened with three sand and three grass courts and has since expanded to 13 sand courts.

Gallery

See also
LSU Tigers women's beach volleyball
LSU Tigers and Lady Tigers

References

External links
Mango’s Beach Volleyball Club at LSUSports.net

Beach volleyball venues in the United States
College beach volleyball venues in the United States
LSU Tigers women's beach volleyball venues
Volleyball venues in Louisiana
Sports venues in Louisiana
Sports venues completed in 1995
1995 establishments in Louisiana